Elections were held in Davao Region for seats in the House of Representatives of the Philippines on May 13, 2013

Summary

Compostela Valley

1st District
Incumbent Maria Carmen Apsay is running unopposed.

2nd District
Incumbent Rommel Amatong is running unopposed.

Davao City

1st District
Karlo Alexei Nograles is Incumbent.

2nd District
Mylene Garcia is the incumbent.

3rd District
Incumbent Isidro Ungab is running unopposed.

Davao del Norte

1st District
Antonio Rafael del Rosario is the incumbent. He join his namesake Capiz Rep. Antonio del Rosario.

2nd District
Antonio Lagdameo is the incumbent.

Davao del Sur

1st District
Incumbent Marc Douglas Cagas is not running for position; instead he is running for the governorship. His mother Board Member Mercedes Cagas is his party's nominee.

2nd District
Franklin Bautista is the incumbent.

Davao Oriental

1st District
Nelson Dayanghirang is the incumbent.

2nd District
Incumbent Thelma Almario is running unopposed.

 
 
 
 
 

2013 Philippine general election
Lower house elections in the Davao Region